Godyris zavaleta, the Zavaleta glasswing, is a species of butterfly of the family Nymphalidae. It is found from Costa Rica to southern Peru. The habitat consists of lowland and mid-elevation rainforests at altitudes up to 900 meters.

Adults visit the flowers of Epidendrum panniculatum. Adult males sequester pyrrolizidine alkaloids from Heliotropium, Tournefourtia, Myosotis, Eupatorium, Neomiranda and Senecio species, making the species toxic to deter predation by birds.

The larvae feed on Solanum species (including S. brenesii), but have also been recorded feeding on Cestrum nocturnum.

Subspecies
G. z. zavaleta (Colombia)
G. z. baudoensis Vitale & Rodriguez, 2004 (Colombia)
G. z. caesiopicta (Niepelt, 1915) (Costa Rica, Panama)
G. z. eutelina Brévignon, 1993 (Guyanas)
G. z. gonussa (Hewitson, 1856) (Colombia)
G. z. huallaga Fox, 1941 (Peru)
G. z. matronalis (Weymer, 1883) (Ecuador)
G. z. petersii (Dewitz, 1877) (Colombia)
G. z. rosata Vitale & Rodriguez, 2004 (Ecuador)
G. z. sosunga (Reakirt, [1866]) (Honduras)
G. z. telesilla (Hewitson, 1863) (Ecuador)
G. z. zygia (Godman & Salvin, 1877) (Costa Rica to Panama)

References

Butterflies described in 1855
Ithomiini
Nymphalidae of South America
Taxa named by William Chapman Hewitson